AsiaLIFE Guide is an English-language lifestyle magazine published in Phnom Penh, Cambodia.

History 
Originally established as AsiaLIFE Phnom Penh in December 2006 by Mark Jackson and Jonny Edbrooke, AsiaLIFE is the leading English-language lifestyle magazine in the Cambodian capital. The magazine went through a re-branding exercise in the summer of 2008, leading to its present title. The first issue of the re-branded magazine dealt with the city's building boom, subsequent issues have focused on fashion, photography, expat life, employment opportunities, architects and artists. The magazine has a sister publication in Vietnam, AsiaLIFE HCMC, launched in 2006.

The Team 
AsiaLIFE Guide Phnom Penh is published in Cambodia by Mekong Media Ltd. 
Mark Jackson is its founder, publisher and editor-in-chief; 
Naomi Robinson is the managing editor, 
Keith Kelly is the Art Director, 
Qudy Xu is the sales manager, 
Johan Smits is the deputy editor, and 
Nathan Horton is the chief photographer.

See also

Media of Cambodia

References

External links
 http://www.asialifemagazine.com

Magazines published in Cambodia
English-language magazines
Magazines established in 2006
Mass media in Phnom Penh
2006 establishments in Cambodia
Lifestyle magazines